"I Don't Have To Be Me ('til Monday)" is a song co-written and recorded by American country music artist Steve Azar.  It was released in October 2001 as the lead-off single from his album Waitin' on Joe.  The song peaked at number 2 on the US Billboard Hot Country Singles & Tracks chart, becoming Azar's highest-peaking single.  Azar wrote this song with R.C. Bannon and Jason Young. It also peaked at number 35 on the Billboard Hot 100, making it his first and only Hot 100 entry, as well as his most successful single to date.

Content
In the song, the male narrator decides to call in sick on Friday so that he can have a three-day weekend. The song is in a 4/4 time signature and moderate tempo in the key of A-flat major, following the chord progression A-E-Fm7-D.

Critical reception
Rick Cohoon of Allmusic gave the song a positive review, calling it "the lyrical embodiment of every working person’s fantasy" and "original, recognizable and conducive to toe tapping."

Chart performance
"I Don't Have to Be Me ('til Monday)" debuted at number 57 on the US Billboard Hot Country Singles & Tracks for the chart week of October 6, 2001. "I Don't Have to Be Me" spent forty-four weeks on the Billboard Hot Country Singles & Tracks (now Hot Country Songs) charts, peaking at number 2 in mid-2002. It was his first charting single since "I Never Stopped Lovin' You" in 1996.

Year-end charts

References

2001 singles
Steve Azar songs
Songs written by Steve Azar
Songs written by R.C. Bannon
Mercury Nashville singles
2001 songs